Black Oak is a town in Craighead County, Arkansas, United States. The population was 262 at the 2010 census. It is included in the Jonesboro, Arkansas Metropolitan Statistical Area. Black Oak is the namesake of 1970s rock band Black Oak Arkansas and the setting of John Grisham's novel A Painted House.

Geography
Black Oak is located in eastern Craighead County at  (35.836510, -90.367504).

Ecologically, Black Oak is located within the St. Francis Lowlands ecoregion within the larger Mississippi Alluvial Plain. The St. Francis Lowlands are a flat region mostly covered with row crop agriculture today, though also containing sand blows and sunken lands remaining from the 1811–12 New Madrid earthquakes. Waterways have mostly been channelized, causing loss of aquatic and riparian wildlife habitat. The St. Francis Sunken Lands Wildlife Management Area, which preserves some of the bottomland hardwood forest typical of this ecoregion prior to development for row agriculture lies just west of Black Oak along the St. Francis River.

List of highways 

 Highway 18
 Highway 135
 Highway 148

Demographics

As of the census of 2000, there were 286 people, 120 households, and 81 families residing in the town. The population density was 641.3 inhabitants per square mile (245.4/km2). The racial makeup of the town was 97.55% White, 0.35% Black or African American, 0.70% Native American, 0.70% Asian, 0.70% from other races.  0.70% of the population were Hispanic or Latino of any race.

There were 120 households, out of which 24.2% had children under the age of 18 living with them, 59.2% were married couples living together, 5.0% had a female householder with no husband present, and 31.7% were non-families. 28.3% of all households were made up of individuals, and 18.3% had someone living alone who was 65 years of age or older. The average household size was 2.38 and the average family size was 2.94.

In the town, the population was spread out, with 20.3% under the age of 18, 6.6% from 18 to 24, 25.9% from 25 to 44, 24.5% from 45 to 64, and 22.7% who were 65 years of age or older. The median age was 42 years.  For every 100 females, there were 111.9 males. For every 100 females age 18 and over, there were 98.3 males.

The median income for a household in the town was $22,353, and the median income for a family was $32,917. Males had a median income of $26,042 versus $20,833 for females. The per capita income for the town was $13,237.  17.5% of the population and 10.7% of families were below the poverty line. Out of the total population, 27.1% of those under the age of 18 and 16.7% of those 65 and older were living below the poverty line.

Notable people 
Black Oak is the hometown of the founding members of the 1970s Southern rock band Black Oak Arkansas.

John Grisham attended first grade at Black Oak Elementary School for one semester, and his novel A Painted House is set in Black Oak and the surrounding area.

Other communities named "Black Oak"
The DeLorme atlas of Arkansas suggests these two hamlets are little more than crossroads.

References

Gallery

Towns in Craighead County, Arkansas
Towns in Arkansas
Jonesboro metropolitan area